Cliona californiana, the yellow boring sponge, boring sponge or sulphur sponge, is a species of demosponge belonging to the family Clionaidae. It is native to the north-eastern Pacific Ocean and burrows into the shell valves of bivalve molluscs.

Description
The yellow boring sponge inhabits living bivalve molluscs, boring into the shell valves. The sponge spicules are silicaceous (glassy) and are scattered throughout the sponge tissues. They consist entirely of megascleres known as "tylostyles", which are a kind of spicule with a single shaft, with a point on one end and a knob on the other. These characteristic spicules distinguish this sponge from any other sponge species found in the locality.

Distribution and habitat
The yellow boring sponge is native to the north-eastern Pacific Ocean, its range extending from Alaska to Baja California. It is most often found in the subtidal zone but also occurs in the intertidal zone.

Ecology
A newly settled young sponge makes its way to the shell of a suitable host and bores into a valve of the mollusc (or the plates of the barnacle). Its tunnelling activities weaken the shell, and scallop and oyster farmers consider the sponge to be a pest. When burrowing, it secretes acid which dissolves the shell, and then it breaks off small pieces of shell and moves them to the exterior. These sponges are common growing on the thick-shelled giant rock scallop (Crassadoma gigantea) and on oysters. The sponge is preyed on by the nudibranch Doriopsilla albopunctata.

References

Demospongiae
Animals described in 1932
Fauna of the Pacific Ocean